The Total J.J. Johnson is an album by jazz trombonist and arranger J. J. Johnson and Big Band recorded in 1966 for the RCA Victor label.

Reception

The Allmusic review by Scott Yanow observed "the emphasis is on the arranged ensembles, making this project an excellent example of Johnson's often-overlooked writing talents".

Track listing
All compositions by J. J. Johnson.
 "Say When" - 2:54
 "Blue" - 5:45
 "In Walked Horace" - 4:42
 "Short Cake" - 2:42
 "Space Walk" - 4:05
 "Euro #1" - 5:54
 "Ballade" - 3:47
 "Little Dave" - 4:02
 "Euro #2" 5:39
Recorded at RCA Victor's Studio A in New York City on November 30, 1966 (tracks 1 & 7), December 2, 1966 (tracks 2, 3, 5 & 8) and December 5, 1966 (tracks 4, 6 & 9)

Personnel 
J. J. Johnson - trombone, arranger, conductor
Art Farmer, Danny Stiles, Snooky Young - trumpet
Paul Faulise, Benny Powell - trombone
Jerome Richardson - alto saxophone, clarinet, flute
Phil Bodner - tenor saxophone, clarinet, flute, oboe
Tommy Newsom - baritone saxophone, bass clarinet, flute
Hank Jones - piano
Ron Carter - bass
Grady Tate - drums

References 

1967 albums
RCA Records albums
J. J. Johnson albums